The Priory Church of St. Anthony, Lenton is a parish church in the Church of England in Lenton, Nottingham.

History

The church largely dates from 1883. However, is thought to incorporate elements of the chapel of the monastic hospital of Lenton Priory.

The church served as the parish church for Lenton, until the building of Holy Trinity Church, Lenton, after which it was left partially demolished for nearly 40 years.

The restoration of the church commenced in 1883 and on 22 November a memorial stone was laid by the Lady of the Manor, Mrs. J. Sherwin Gregory, consecrated by Christopher, Bishop of Lincoln, being dedicated the following year to the Church of St. Anthony, commonly known as the Priory Church. The work was carried out by Evans and Jolley and it was re-opened on 4 December 1884

It is part of a group of parishes which includes Holy Trinity Church, Lenton.

Organ
The church has a pipe organ by Ernest Wragg and Son installed in 1924.

References

Church of England church buildings in Nottinghamshire
Grade II listed churches in Nottinghamshire
Churches in Nottingham
Churches completed in 1883
1883 establishments in England